The Loi Veil, officially the "Law of 17 January 1975 on the voluntary termination of pregnancy", is a law pertaining to the decriminalization of abortion in France. It was prepared by Simone Veil, minister of health during the presidency of Valéry Giscard d'Estaing.

The law was promulgated on 17 January 1975 with a duration of five years. It was renewed without time limit by a law passed on 31 December 1979.

Background 

After the Bobigny trial, the minister of justice instructed the Ministère public to cease prosecuting abortion.

An early law decriminalizing abortion was tabled under the presidency of Georges Pompidou (1969-1974).

Valéry Giscard d'Estaing promised to decriminalize abortion during his presidential campaign in 1974. As Minister of Justice, it fell to Jean Lecanuet to defend the law in Parliament, but he refused on grounds of personal ethics. Therefore, Minister of Health Simone Veil was charged with preparing the law soon after the election. She brought the law before the National Assembly on 26 November 1974, declaring in her speech:

The vote was the object of heated, sometimes vicious debate. Jean Foyer, who lead the opposition to the law, declared in his response: 

After some 25 hours of intense debate by 74 speakers, the law was finally adopted by the Assembly on 29 November 1974 at 3:40 am, by a vote of 284 in favour and 189 against, thanks to the near-unanimous support from the parties of the left and the centre, against the objection of the majority, but not the entirety, of the members on the right, led by Jean Foyer (UDR), and including Simone Veil's own party.

The law was promulgated on 17 January. It was initially in force for a five-year period on an experimental basis. It was renewed without time limit by law n°79-1204 on 31 December 1979.

Content 
The Loi Veil decriminalized, for a period of five years, voluntary termination of pregnancy before the end of the tenth week of gestation, with certain conditions:

 situation of distress;
 pregnancy of equal to or less than 10 weeks (12 weeks of amenorrhea);
 intervention performed by a doctor in a hospital setting;
 mandatory information and reflection procedures: two medical consultations (with a delay for reflection between the two) in which the risks and alternatives are presented by the doctors, and a psycho-social consultation;
 consent confirmed in writing;
 doctors and other health care personnel covered by a conscience clause, such that no one is required to terminate a pregnancy if they hold ethical objections.

The law also legalized, for a period of five years, voluntary termination of pregnancy for therapeutic reasons, which could be practiced under certain conditions:

 serious danger to the health of the parent or strong probability that the unborn child would suffer from a particularly serious condition recognized as incurable at the time of diagnosis, as attested by two doctors;
 no delay, and performable until the last day of the pregnancy;
 intervention performed by a doctor in a hospital setting;
 doctors and other health care personnel covered by a conscience clause, such that no one is required to terminate a pregnancy if they hold ethical objections.

Sources 
 Simone Veil, une loi au nom des femmes (2010), documentary by Valérie Manns and Richard Puech, broadcast 4 March 2010 on France 2. (watch online on DailyMotion)

References

External links 

 Loi Veil on the National Assembly website

1975 in law
1975 in France
Society of France
Abortion in France
Law of France
Abortion-rights movement
Feminism in France